Xinyang railway station is a station on Beijing–Guangzhou railway and Nanjing–Xi'an railway in Shihe District, Xinyang, Henan.

History
The station was established in 1902 and is the station with the longest operation history on Beijing–Hankou section of Beijing–Guangzhou railway.

References

Railway stations in Henan
Stations on the Beijing–Guangzhou Railway
Railway stations in China opened in 1902